Zulaikha Patel (born 2003) is a South African anti-racism activist. She became a symbol of the fight against Pretoria Girls High School's policy regarding black girls' hair in 2016, at the age of 13. She and her classmates held a demonstration that led to not only a change in school policy, but also an inquiry into allegations of racism at the school. She is quoted as saying: “Asking me to change my hair is like asking me to erase my blackness.”

The Issue in Pretoria Girls' High School 
Pretoria Girls' High School, is located in Pretoria, Republic of South Africa. The school was founded in 1902, and was all white since founding until 1990, as South African schools were segregated before Apartheid,  but since 1990, the school is open to all races. According to CNN, Pretoria Girls' Code of Conduct does not specifically mention afros, but it does lay out rules for general appearance, including prescribing that all styles "should be conservative, neat and in keeping with the school uniform." Teachers had told the students that their afro hair is "exotic" and needed to be tamed. It was implied that girls' hair needed to be straightened or tied back, not worn as Afros.

Zulaikha Patel was among the students who led a demonstration against Pretoria Girls High, against the all-girls school's hair policy. The demonstrating teenagers were threatened with arrest as Zulaikha Patel led the silent protest. A video posted online showed Zulaikha Patel as she faced three armed security guards who were hired by the school management to break up the demonstration. This video caused a large backlash against the school.

The Aftermath of Zulaikha's' Protest 
Zulaikha Patel's actions inspired other protests in South Africa, at Lawson Brown High School in the Eastern Cape, and St. Michael's School for Girls in Bloemfontein where parents marched as well. People worldwide began sharing pictures of their own afros on social media, in solidarity with the female students of Pretoria High School. International press coverage ensued. The protests showed that racial divisions persist, despite the 1991 end of apartheid.

Patel's defiance initiated more protests and change. Gauteng Education MEC, Panyaza Lesufi visited Pretoria Girls' High School to hear the black students’ grievances, not only about the hair policy, but about racism in general at the school. For example, girls are not permitted to speak African languages on the school premises, only English or Afrikaans. Patrick Gaspard, US ambassador to South Africa, tweeted: "All societies have rules. And sometimes those rules are biased and need to be exposed and protested." An online petition had almost 25,000 signatures within a day. The Gauteng Department of Education suspended the hair policy.

Recognition
She was recognized as one of the BBC's 100 women of 2016.

References

2003 births
Living people
BBC 100 Women
South African activists